Alfred Bittins (1909 – 1970) was a German film producer and production manager. He also co-directed the 1959 film Jenny.

Selected filmography
 Frisians in Peril (1935)
 Comrades at Sea (1938)
 The Confession of Ina Kahr (1954)
 Heroism after Hours (1955)
 Lost Child 312 (1955)
 The Model Husband (1956)
 I'll Carry You in My Arms (1958)
 Mandolins and Moonlight (1959)
 Jenny (1959)
 The Post Has Gone (1962)
 Lana, Queen of the Amazons (1964)

References

Bibliography
 Giesen, Rolf. Nazi Propaganda Films: A History and Filmography. McFarland & Company, 2003.

External links

1909 births
1970 deaths
Film people from Berlin